Luke Cook (born 19 December 1986) is an Australian actor, director, writer, and content creator, known for his role as Lucifer in Chilling Adventures of Sabrina.

Early life 
Cook was born in Sydney, Australia, and is the youngest of five children. Cook grew up in a religious family with his father being a church minister.

In grade six he auditioned for his school play by impersonating Frank Sinatra, and was so thrilled by the audience reaction that he decided to become an actor.

Career 
While studying acting in Sydney, Cook met a manager from Los Angeles who encouraged him to move to California which he did at the age of 22. Cook spent ten years in LA pursuing acting before his big break and noted that he was given some great opportunities to be on major shows, but issues popped up along the way; "Looking back, there’s a very funny story. When I got off the plane, I had two big tv shows booked, and couldn't do them because of my visa. I even thought to myself whenever I booked them, 'I haven't worked hard enough for this,' and as soon as I thought that, I couldn't work because of my visa. After that I didn't book anything for years. Then I had to grind and grind for years. It's funny the way the universe works, or God, or whatever you like to call it." In between acting roles Cook worked as a bartender and credits the decade of struggle for helping him to not take anything for granted.

The first role he scored in Los Angeles was the sitcom Mystery Girls starring Tori Spelling and Jenny Garth. Cook played RuPaul's evil assistant.

In 2016, Cook wrote and performed the starring role in the short film Good Morning. The film was an official selection at a number of film festivals, and Cook won the 2017 Flagler Film Festival award for Best Actor, Drama/Thriller.

In 2017, Cook made his feature film debut in "Guardians of the Galaxy Vol. 2.". In the same year he played opposite Al Pacino in the theatre production of "God Looked Away".

Playing the role of Lucifer Morningstar, the devil, Cook shot the first series of Chilling Adventures of Sabrina in November 2018 and the next series in July 2019.

In September 2019, Cook shot Katy Keene in which he plays Guy LaMontagne.

In 2020, Cook wrapped on indie film Eye Without A Face in which he stars as a con man. In the same year he starred in Australian indie film How Do You Know Chris in the title role.

In February 2021, Cook was announced in the upcoming fourth season of Dynasty and will play Kirby's ex-boyfriend Oliver.

In July 2021, it was confirmed that Cook will be joining the second season of Dollface as a recurring guest star.

In most of 2021 and 2022, he's become a mainstay on TikTok.

Personal life 
Cook and New Zealander stylist Kara Wilson became engaged in December 2019  and they were married on May 16, 2020. Their son, Chaplin Benjamin, was born in November 2020 and their second son, Ozzie Alexander, was born November 15, 2022. He has a rescued chihuahua named Cindy.

Cook told Brief Take that he would love to do some big character roles in a similar vein to Jim Carrey, and also cites Ben Stiller and Ricky Gervais as influences.

Social media is where Cook shows off his impersonation and acting skills with his wider fan base. He has created a group of characters such as a model manager named Steve Kay and an Australian mother named Louise.

Cook is involved with a number of charities including The Leukemia & Lymphoma Society and raised $10k for a hospital in Sierra Leone by selling photos of his feet.

Due to her religious beliefs, Cook's mother refuses to watch him play the satanic role in Chilling Adventures of Sabrina, however his father is encouraging.

Filmography

Film

Television

Theatre

References 

1986 births
21st-century Australian male actors
Australian expatriate male actors in the United States
Australian male film actors
Australian male television actors
Living people
Male actors from Sydney